The 2014–15 Saint Mary's Gaels men's basketball team represented Saint Mary's College of California during the 2014–15 NCAA Division I men's basketball season. This was head coach Randy Bennett's fourteenth season at Saint Mary's. The Gaels competed in the West Coast Conference and played their home games at the McKeon Pavilion. They finished the season 21–10, 13–5 in WCC play to finish in a tie for second place. They lost in the quarterfinals of the WCC tournament to Portland. They were invited to the National Invitation Tournament where they lost in the first round to Vanderbilt.

Previous season 
The Gaels finished the season 23–12, 11–7 in WCC play to finish in fourth place. They advanced to the semi-finals of the WCC tournament where they lost to Gonzaga. They were invited to the National Invitation Tournament where they defeated Utah in the first round before losing in the second round to Minnesota.

Departures

Incoming Transfers

Recruiting

Roster

Schedule and results

|-
!colspan=9 style="background:#06315B; color:#D80024;"| Regular season

|-
!colspan=9 style="background:#06315B; color:#D80024;"| WCC tournament

|-
!colspan=9 style="background:#06315B; color:#D80024;"| NIT

References

Saint Mary's
Saint Mary's Gaels men's basketball seasons
Saint Mary's